Filipinmulciber breuningi is a species of beetle in the family Cerambycidae, and the only species in the genus Filipinmulciber. It was described by Vives in 2009.

References

Homonoeini
Beetles described in 2009